HMS Starling was a 4-gun schooner of the British Royal Navy, one of the two ships in an expedition led by Edward Belcher to survey the Pacific coast of the Americas. Henry Kellett was captain of the ship in the First Opium War with China.

References

Exploration ships of the United Kingdom
Lark-class cutter
1829 ships
Ships built in Pembroke Dock